Shiva Naipaul (25 February 1945 – 13 August 1985), born Shivadhar Srinivasa Naipaul in Port of Spain, Trinidad and Tobago, was an Indo-Trinidadian and British novelist and journalist.

Life and work
Shiva Naipaul was the younger brother of novelist V. S. Naipaul. He went first to Queen's Royal College and St Mary's College in Trinidad, then emigrated to Britain, having won a scholarship to study Chinese at University College, Oxford. At Oxford, he met and later married Jenny Stuart, with whom he had a son, Tarun.

With Jenny's support, Shiva Naipaul wrote his first novel, Fireflies (1970), which won the Winifred Holtby Memorial Prize from the Royal Society of Literature for best regional novel.  It was followed by The Chip-Chip Gatherers (1973). He then decided to concentrate on journalism, and wrote two non-fiction works, North of South (1978) and Black & White (1980), before returning to the novel form in the 1980s with A Hot Country (1983), a departure from his two earlier comic novels set in Trinidad, as well as a collection of fiction and non-fiction, Beyond the Dragon's Mouth: Stories and Pieces (1984).

Death
On the morning of 13 August 1985, at the age of 40, Naipaul had a fatal heart attack while working at his desk.

In an essay V. S. Naipaul wrote for The New Yorker, published in 2019, his older brother reports that he wasn't surprised at the time to hear about Shiva's death, that Shiva was a drinker, and that a year prior to his death (at a funeral for their younger sister that both had attended) V. S. describes having already seen the look of death in his brother's face.”

Legacy and posthumous reputation
The Spectator magazine, for which his wife Jenny had worked as a secretary, and which had published many of his articles, established the Shiva Naipaul Memorial Prize.

Writing for The Atlantic in 2008, Christopher Hitchens called his debut novel Fireflies "one of the great tragicomic novels of our day".

In Paul Theroux's Sir Vidia's Shadow, a memoir of Shiva's elder brother, V. S. Naipaul, Theroux described Shiva as a "sot", shrunken by the towering figure of his successful brother, with a penchant for drunken partying and a need to have his meals made for him. Theroux also took issue with Naipaul's skills as a writer, particularly as a travel writer. Sir Vidia's Shadow has come under attack for what are described as inaccuracies, and the novelist Martin Amis wrote that "Shiva Naipaul was one of those people who caused your heart to lift when he entered the room ... in losing him, we have lost thirty years of untranscribed, unvarnished genius". 

An Arena documentary on his brother V. S. Naipaul reproduced footage of Shiva from an earlier documentary from the early 1980s, in which Shiva returned to Trinidad to see his mother.

Shiva Naipaul's literary archive is held at the British Library. The collection (The Shiva Naipaul Archive) "consists of autograph and typescript drafts of Shiva Naipaul's fiction novels, non-fiction and travel writing. It also includes research and drafts relating to his articles, short stories and prose. There is a run of autograph notebooks, largely with notes and research gathered on his travels in India, Trinidad and Tobago, Surinam, Guyana, America, South Africa, Africa, and Australia. There is correspondence dating form his university days, with his family, his wife and a run of business correspondence."

Works

Novels
Fireflies (1970)
The Chip-Chip Gatherers (1973)
A Hot Country (1983), published in the U.S. as Love and Death in a Hot Country
Nonfiction
North of South (1978)
Black & White (1980), published in the U.S. as Journey to Nowhere
An Unfinished Journey (1986).
Collections
Beyond the Dragon's Mouth: Stories and Pieces (1984)
A Man of Mystery and Other Stories (1995), a selection of stories taken from Beyond the Dragon's Mouth.

See also
 Capildeo family

References

External links
Bibliography at fanstasticfiction.co.uk

1945 births
1985 deaths
Alumni of Queen's Royal College, Trinidad
Alumni of University College, Oxford
British male journalists
British people of Indo-Trinidadian descent
Trinidad and Tobago people of Indian descent
John Llewellyn Rhys Prize winners
Male novelists
Shiva
Trinidad and Tobago Hindus
Trinidad and Tobago male writers
Trinidad and Tobago novelists
20th-century British male writers
20th-century novelists